The Northern Kentucky Norse baseball team is a varsity intercollegiate athletic team of Northern Kentucky University in Highland Heights, Kentucky, United States. The team is a member of the Horizon League, which is part of the National Collegiate Athletic Association's Division I. The team plays its home games at Bill Aker Baseball Complex in Highland Heights, Kentucky.

History

Todd Asalon era (2001-2021)
After the 2012 season, Northern Kentucky made the step up to Division I, joining the Atlantic Sun Conference. In 2016, Northern Kentucky joined the Horizon League. 2017 would be the winningest Division I season under Asalon, with the Norse compiling a 25–33 record. On February 26, 2021, Todd Asalon announced that he would retire from the head coaching position at the end of the 2021 season.

Dizzy Peyton era (2022-present)
On June 6, 2021, Northern Kentucky announced that longtime assistant coach Dizzy Peyton would fill the head coaching vacancy left by Todd Asalon's retirement.

Head coaches

See also
List of NCAA Division I baseball programs

References

External links